Stuart Hughes is a Canadian actor.

Stuart Hughes is also the name of:

 Stuart Hughes (politician), British politician in the Official Monster Raving Loony Party
 H. Stuart Hughes, American academic

See also